Llantarnam is a suburban village of Cwmbran, and is a community and electoral ward in the county borough of Torfaen in south east Wales. The ward covers the same area as the community, but also includes Southville. It is equidistant from Cwmbran town centre and the town of Caerleon.

Llantarnam Abbey is a  Cistercian abbey founded in 1179 as a daughter house of Strata Florida Abbey. The remains of that abbey are incorporated into the present buildings housing the Sisters of Saint Joseph. It also contains St Michael's Church.

Llantarnam Hall is home to Rougemont School.

In 2015 Llantarnam School amalgamated with Fairwater High School to make the new school of
Cwmbran High School.

Demographics
At the 2011 Census
Population 4,125 (community), 5,526 (ward), (Torfaen 91,075)

Notable people
David Lewis (martyr)
Thomas Morgan (of Llantarnam)

See also

Llantarnam railway station, closed in 1962

References

 South Wales Argus - Article - Merged school will be called Cwmbran High School - 15/11/2014

External links
 Llantarnam Grange Arts Centre (in Cwmbran Centre)

Communities in Torfaen
Electoral wards of Torfaen
Suburbs of Cwmbran